Djibril Diouf (born 8 March 1957) is a Senegalese wrestler. He competed in the men's freestyle 74 kg at the 1988 Summer Olympics.

References

External links
 

1957 births
Living people
Senegalese male sport wrestlers
Olympic wrestlers of Senegal
Wrestlers at the 1988 Summer Olympics
Place of birth missing (living people)